S. H. Dudley may refer to:
Sherman H. Dudley (1872-1940), American vaudeville entertainer and pioneer black theater entrepreneur
Samuel H. Rous (1864-1947), American pioneer recording artist and singer with the Haydn Quartet, who was usually billed as S. H. Dudley